Pier Paolo Taddei (born 29 June 1949) is a Sammarinese sports shooter. He competed at the 1980 Summer Olympics and the 1984 Summer Olympics.

References

1949 births
Living people
Sammarinese male sport shooters
Olympic shooters of San Marino
Shooters at the 1980 Summer Olympics
Shooters at the 1984 Summer Olympics
Place of birth missing (living people)